The New Group, is a New York City Off-Broadway theatrical troupe founded by Artistic Director Scott Elliott, that produced its first play, Mike Leigh's Ecstasy, in 1995. 
The New Group is run by founding Artistic Director, Scott Elliott, and Executive Director, Adam Bernstein.

The New Group was recognized with the 2004 Tony award for Best Musical for Avenue Q originated at the Vinyard Theatre in 2003.

Home theatre history
Since 2003 the home theatre for the group has mostly been on West 42nd Street on Theatre Row. The main theatres since founding are:

1995             - John Houseman Theatre
1996–1998 - INTAR Theatre
1999–2003 - Theater at St. Clement's Church
2003–2014 - Acorn Theatre
2014–2022 - Pershing Square Signature Center

Production history
1995
Ecstasy by Mike Leigh, directed by Scott Elliott
1996
Curtains by Stephen Bill, directed by Scott Elliott
1996–1997
This Is Our Youth by Kenneth Lonergan, directed by Mark Brokaw
The Flatted Fifth by Seth Zvi Rosenfeld, directed by Jo Bonney
My Night With Reg by Kevin Elyot, directed by Jack Hofsiss
1997–1998
Goose-Pimples by Mike Leigh, directed by Scott Elliott
Hazelwood Jr. High by Rob Urbinati, directed by Scott Elliott
The Fastest Clock in the Universe by Philip Ridley, directed by Jo Bonney
1998–1999
Some Voices by Joe Penhall, directed by Frank Pugliese
Halfway Home by Diane Bank, directed by Stephen Williford
East is East by Ayub Khan-Din, directed by Scott Elliott
1999–2000
Cranes by Dmitry Lipkin, directed by Scott Elliott
Another American: Asking and Telling by Marc Wolf, directed by Joe Mantello
Betwixt by David Cale, directed by Scott Elliott and Andy Goldberg
2000–2001
What the Butler Saw by Joe Orton, directed by Scott Elliott
Paradise Island by Benjie Aerenson, directed by Andy Goldberg
Servicemen by Evan Smith, directed by Sean Mathias
2001–2002
Good Thing by Jessica Goldberg, directed by Jo Bonney
Smelling a Rat by Mike Leigh, directed by Scott Elliott
2002–2003
Comedians by Trevor Griffiths, directed by Scott Elliott
Avenue Q music & lyrics by Robert Lopez and Jeff Marx, book by Jeff Whitty, directed by Jason Moore
The Women of Lockerbie by Deborah Brevoort, directed by Scott Elliott
2003–2004
Aunt Dan and Lemon by Wallace Shawn, directed by Scott Elliott
Roar by Betty Shamieh, directed by Marion McClinton
2004–2005
SIN (A Cardinal Deposed) by Michael Murphy, directed by Carl Forsman
A Likely Story by David Cale, directed by Tamara Jenkins
Hurlyburly by David Rabe, directed by Scott Elliott
Critical Darling by Barry Levey, directed by Ian Morgan
Terrorism by The Presnyakov Brothers, translated by Sasha Dugdale, directed by Will Frears
2005–2006
Abigail's Party by Mike Leigh, directed by Scott Elliott
The Music Teacher words by Wallace Shawn, music by Allen Shawn, directed by Tom Cairns
A Spalding Gray Matter written and performed by Michael Brandt, directed by Ian Morgan
Jayson with a Y by Darci Picoult, directed by Sheryl Kaller
Everythings Thurning into Beautiful by Seth Zvi Rosenfeld, directed by Carl Forsman
2006–2007
The Prime of Miss Jean Brodie by Jay Presson Allen, directed by Scott Elliott
The Fever by Wallace Shawn, directed by Scott Elliott
The Accomplices by Bernard Weinraub, directed by Ian Morgan
Expats by Heather Lynn MacDonald, directed by Ari Edelson
Strangers Knocking by Robert Tenges, directed by Marie Masters
2007–2008
Things We Want by Jonathan Marc Sherman, directed by Ethan Hawke
Two Thousand Years by Mike Leigh, directed by Scott Elliott
Rafta, Rafta... by Ayub Khan-Din, directed by Scott Elliott
Rich Boyfriend by Evan Smith, directed by Ian Morgan
2008–2009
Mouth to Mouth by Kevin Elyot, directed by Mark Brokaw
Mourning Becomes Electra by Eugene O'Neill, directed by Scott Elliott
Groundswell by Ian Bruce, directed by Scott Elliott
2009–2010
The Starry Messenger written and directed by Kenneth Lonergan
A Lie of the Mind by Sam Shepard, directed by Ethan Hawke
The Kid by Andy Monroe, Michael Zam and Jack Lechner, based on the book by Dan Savage, directed by Scott Elliott
2010–2011
Blood From A Stone by Tommy Nohilly, directed by Scott Elliott
Marie and Bruce by Wallace Shawn, directed by Scott Elliott
One Arm based on the short story and screenplay by Tennessee Williams, adapted for the stage and directed by Moisés Kaufman
2011–2012
Burning by Thomas Bradshaw, directed by Scott Elliott
Russian Transport by Erika Sheffer, directed by Scott Elliott
An Early History of Fire by David Rabe, directed by Jo Bonney
2012–2013
The Good Mother by Francine Volpe, directed by Scott Elliott
Clive based on Bertolt Brecht's Baal retold by Jonathan Marc Sherman, directed by Ethan Hawke
Bunty Berman Presents..., book and lyrics by Ayub Khan Din, music by Ayub Khan Din and Paul Bogaev, directed by Scott Elliott
2013–2014
The Jacksonian by Beth Henley, directed by Robert Falls
Intimacy by Thomas Bradshaw, directed by Scott Elliott
Annapurna by Sharr White, directed by Bart DeLorenzo
2014–2015
Sticks and Bones by David Rabe, directed by Scott Elliott
Rasheeda Speaking by Joel Drake Johnson, directed by Cynthia Nixon
The Spoils by Jesse Eisenberg, directed by Scott Elliott
2015–2016
Mercury Fur by Philip Ridley, directed by Scott Elliott
Steve by Mark Gerrard, directed by Cynthia Nixon
Buried Child by Sam Shepard, directed by Scott Elliott
2016–2017
Sweet Charity''' by Cy Coleman, Dorothy Fields, Neil SimonEvening at the Talk House by Wallace ShawnThe Whirlgig by Hamish Linklater
2017–018Downtown Race Riot by Seth Zvi RosenfeldJerry Springer – The Opera by Richard Thomas and Stewart LeeGood for Otto by David RabePeace for Mary Frances by Lily Thorne

Premieres

The New Group has produced numerous world premieres including Steve, The Spoils, Intimacy, Burning, Russian Transport, Blood From a Stone, The Starry Messenger, The Accomplices, and Avenue Q''.

References

External links

Theatre companies in New York City
Obie Award recipients